Mirko Mazzari (born 25 January 1975) is an Italian former swimmer who competed in the 1996 Summer Olympics and in the 2000 Summer Olympics.

References

1975 births
Living people
Italian male swimmers
Italian male backstroke swimmers
Olympic swimmers of Italy
Swimmers at the 1996 Summer Olympics
Swimmers at the 2000 Summer Olympics
Swimmers of Centro Sportivo Carabinieri
20th-century Italian people
21st-century Italian people